Q.E.D. is an album of contemporary classical music by guitarist Terje Rypdal recorded in 1991 and released on the ECM label in 1993.

Reception
The Allmusic review by Paul Collins awarded the album 3 stars stating "Rypdal often alternates sections of great dissonance with near silence, or lonely sustained notes by just one or two instruments. It can have the sweeping starkness of a tracking shot over a fjord, but there's a certain coldness to it as well, and even confirmed fans of his jazz work may take a while to warm up to it".

Track listing
All compositions by Terje Rypdal
 "Quod Erat Demonstrandum (Opus 52): 1st Movement" - 4:56   
 "Quod Erat Demonstrandum (Opus 52): 2nd Movement" - 2:20   
 "Quod Erat Demonstrandum (Opus 52): 3rd Movement" - 4:55   
 "Quod Erat Demonstrandum (Opus 52): 4th Movement" - 4:52   
 "Quod Erat Demonstrandum (Opus 52): 5th Movement" - 18:21   
 "Largo (Opus 55)" - 16:47

Personnel
Terje Rypdal — electric guitar
Borealis Ensemble — conducted by Christian Eggen (track 1)

References

ECM Records albums
Terje Rypdal albums
1993 albums
Albums produced by Manfred Eicher